Corey Kent White is an American country music singer. After competing on the television talent show The Voice in 2015, White recorded a number of releases. He shortened his name to Corey Kent in 2022 and charted again with the song "Wild as Her".

Biography
Corey Kent White was born in Bixby, Oklahoma. Kent grew up listening to country music, taking influence from artists such as fellow Oklahoma native Garth Brooks. By age 11, he made his first public performance at the Oklahoma State Fair. White graduated high school at age sixteen and briefly moved to Nashville, Tennessee before returning to his home state in order to attend Oklahoma State University. While there, he began writing songs and performing in nightclubs. From there, he moved back to Nashville to begin a country music career. After recording an extended play in 2014, he competed on the television singing competition The Voice a year later. He was selected for the show's eighth season. He competed on Blake Shelton's team and was eliminated from the final eight. Despite this, the songs he covered while on The Voice made the Billboard Hot Country Songs charts. In 2016, he released his debut album Long Way.

After shortening his name to Corey Kent, he returned to the Billboard charts in 2022 with a cover of Canadian country music artist Tyler Joe Miller's "Wild as Her". Due to popularity on streaming services, the song charted in late 2022. The song is a follow-up to Kent's second studio album, 21. Because of this song's initial charting success, Billboard reported that many Nashville labels were in a bidding war to sign Kent. RCA Records Nashville signed Kent in August 2022 and began promoting "Wild as Her" to country radio.

Discography

Albums

Singles

References

American country singers
American male singers
Country musicians from Oklahoma
Living people
People from Bixby, Oklahoma
RCA Records Nashville artists
The Voice (franchise) contestants
Year of birth missing (living people)